The Kowalski ester homologation is a chemical reaction for the homologation of esters.

This reaction was designed as a safer alternative to the Arndt–Eistert synthesis, avoiding the need for diazomethane. The Kowalski reaction is named after its inventor, Conrad J. Kowalski.

Reaction mechanism 

The mechanism is disputed.

Variations 

By changing the reagent in the second step of the reaction, the Kowalski ester homologation can also be used for the preparation of silyl ynol ethers.

See also 

 Curtius rearrangement

References 

Rearrangement reactions
Carbon-carbon bond forming reactions

Name reactions
Homologation reactions